Heinz Baumkötter (7 February 1912 – 21 April 2001) was an SS-Hauptsturmführer and concentration camp medical doctor in Mauthausen, Natzweiler-Struthof and Sachsenhausen, who conducted medical experiments on concentration camp inmates.

Baumkötter was tried in the Sachsenhausen trials by a Soviet military tribunal in 1947 in a trial held in the former city hall in Berlin-Pankow. Among his co-defendants were the former commandant of Sachsenhausen Anton Kaindl, the record keeper Gustav Sorge and the Blockfuhrer of the punishment block Kurt Eccarius.
At the trial Baumkötter was asked what his duties were at the trial:

Baumkötter was found guilty of war crimes and sentenced to 25 years in prison with hard labor, which he served in the coal mines of Vorkuta Gulag. He was released early in 1956, when the Soviet Union released remaining German POWs. He was re-arrested by the West German police in July the same year. On 19 February a court sentenced him to eight years in prison. The court took into consideration his stint in the Gulag as sufficient punishment and released him.

References

1912 births
2001 deaths
People from Steinfurt
SS-Hauptsturmführer
People from the Province of Westphalia
Mauthausen concentration camp personnel
Sachsenhausen concentration camp personnel
Waffen-SS personnel
Foreign Gulag detainees
Prisoners sentenced to life imprisonment by the Soviet Union